Albert Martin Reynolds (3 November 1932 – 21 August 2014) was an Irish Fianna Fáil politician who served as Taoiseach from 1992 to 1994, Leader of Fianna Fáil from 1992 to 1994, Minister for Finance from 1988 to 1991, Minister for Industry and Commerce from 1987 to 1988, Minister for Industry and Energy from March 1982 to December 1982, Minister for Transport from 1980 to 1981 and Minister for Posts and Telegraphs from 1979 to 1981. He served as a Teachta Dála (TD) from 1977 to 2002.

Reynolds was first elected to Dáil Éireann as a TD for Longford–Westmeath in 1977, and was re-elected at each election (from 1992 serving as TD for Longford-Roscommon), until his retirement in 2002.

During his first term as Taoiseach, he led a Fianna Fáil–Progressive Democrats coalition. In his second term, he was head of one between Fianna Fáil and the Labour Party.

Early life 
Albert Reynolds was born in Kilglass, near Roosky, on the Roscommon–Leitrim border on 3 November 1932. His father was a coachbuilder. All his life his political enemies would call him a "country bumpkin".

He was educated at Summerhill College in County Sligo, and found work as a clerk with CIÉ, the state transport service, in the 1950s. Reynolds left what many would consider being a "job for life" in the state company and moved into the showband scene, coming to own several dance halls in his local area. He became wealthy from this venture during the 1960s when dance halls proved extremely popular. He invested his money in several businesses, including a pet food company, a bacon factory, a fish-exporting operation and a hire purchase company. Reynolds also had business interests in local newspapers and a cinema. Although his dance hall empire required late-night work, Reynolds abstained from alcohol. He was a traditional family man and had a happy home life with his wife Kathleen (1932–2021) and their seven children. He developed a network of business contacts both nationally and internationally.

Early political life 
Reynolds became interested in politics at the time of the Arms Crisis in 1970, a controversial episode in which two government ministers, Minister for Agriculture and Fisheries Neil Blaney and Minister for Finance Charles Haughey, were removed from the government over an attempt to send arms to Northern Ireland, where thousands of Catholic families had been driven from their homes, of whom 1,000 had fled across the border to the Republic. Blaney and Haughey were later acquitted in court.

In the wake of this case, Reynolds launched a political career from his background as a successful west-of-Ireland businessman. However, at 44 years of age when first an electoral candidate, he was considered a late starter. He stood for Fianna Fáil at the 1977 general election for the Longford–Westmeath constituency. The election proved to be a landslide victory for Fianna Fáil, with the party receiving a 20-seat parliamentary majority, resulting in Jack Lynch returning as Taoiseach.

Reynolds remained a backbencher until 1979. Pressure mounted that year on Lynch, the incumbent Taoiseach and Fianna Fáil leader, to step down. Reynolds became a member of the so-called "gang of five" politicians of a strong rural background, with Jackie Fahey (Tipperary), Mark Killilea Jnr (Galway), Tom McEllistrim (Kerry) and Seán Doherty (Roscommon), which aligned itself to Charles Haughey and supported him in the subsequent leadership contest.

Fianna Fáil minister 
Reynolds was rewarded for his staunch loyalty by joining the newly elected Taoiseach Charles Haughey's cabinet as Minister for Posts and Telegraphs. He was appointed Minister for Transport, making his brief one of the largest and most wide-ranging in the government. As Minister for Transport, Reynolds was involved in a bizarre incident in which an Aer Lingus plane was hijacked by a disturbed former monk, with the hijacker's chief demand for the safe return of the aircraft and its passengers being that he should be allowed to reveal a religious secret, the Third Secret of Fatima, which he claimed to have in his briefcase. The incident was resolved in Paris with no injuries.

Fianna Fáil lost power following the 1981 general election but regained it again following the February 1982 general election. Reynolds returned to government as Minister for Industry and Energy. He was responsible for developing the Dublin to Cork gas pipeline. That government fell in late 1982, and Reynolds was back on the opposition benches. During the 1982–83 period, the Fianna Fáil leader, Charles Haughey, faced three no-confidence motions. Reynolds gave him his support at all times, and Haughey survived, defeating his opponents and critics within the party.

In 1987, Fianna Fáil returned to government, and Reynolds was appointed Minister for Industry and Commerce, one of the most senior positions in the cabinet, especially when the government's top priority was economic recovery. In 1988, Minister for Finance Ray MacSharry became Ireland's European Commissioner, and Reynolds succeeded MacSharry in the most powerful department in government.

Coalition (1989–1992) 

The 1989 general election resulted in Fianna Fáil taking the unprecedented move of entering into a coalition with the four-year-old free-market-centric Progressive Democrats (PD). Reynolds headed the Fianna Fáil negotiation team with another minister, Bertie Ahern. A programme for government was finally agreed upon almost a month after the general election, and Reynolds returned as Minister for Finance in a coalition government that he described as a "temporary little arrangement".

The failure of Fianna Fáil candidate Brian Lenihan to be elected as President of Ireland added to the pressure on Haughey's leadership. In a speech in County Cork, Reynolds announced that if a vacancy arose in the leadership, he would contest it—a clear and open revolt against Haughey's leadership. Several TDs and senators, including some cabinet members, also began to grow disillusioned with Haughey, and they began to look for a successor. Reynolds was the most popular: his profile was enhanced by the so-called "Country & Western" group of TDs (so named because they came from mostly rural counties, as well as Reynolds's earlier fortune in the dance hall business) who began to agitate within the party on his behalf. In November 1991, a relatively unknown rural TD, Seán Power, put down a motion of no confidence in Haughey. Reynolds and a staunch supporter, Pádraig Flynn, announced their support for the motion, and Haughey promptly had them sacked from the cabinet. When the vote was taken, the party reaffirmed its support for Haughey. It looked as though Reynolds's political career was finished.

Haughey's victory was short-lived, as a series of political errors would lead to his demise as Taoiseach. Controversy erupted over the attempted appointment of Jim McDaid as Minister for Defence, and McDaid resigned from the post before he was appointed. Worse was to follow when Seán Doherty, the man who as Minister for Justice had taken the blame for the phone-tapping scandal of the early 1980s, went on television on RTÉ to reveal that Haughey had known about and authorised the phone-tapping. Haughey denied all charges, but the PD government members stated that they could no longer continue in government with him as Taoiseach. Haughey told Desmond O'Malley, the PD leader, that he intended to resign shortly but wanted to choose his own time of departure. O'Malley agreed to this, and the government continued.

Taoiseach (1992–1994)

22nd Government of Ireland (1992–1993) 

On 30 January 1992, Haughey retired as leader of Fianna Fáil at a parliamentary party meeting. Reynolds easily defeated his rivals Mary O'Rourke and Michael Woods in the party leadership election and succeeded Haughey as Taoiseach on 11 February 1992.

The ministers who had been sacked along with Reynolds at the end of 1991 were all appointed to cabinet, while eight members of Haughey's cabinet, including such long-serving Haughey loyalists as Ray Burke, Mary O'Rourke and Gerry Collins, were left out. Nine of the twelve junior ministers, many of whom were also Haughey supporters, were also dismissed. Reynolds promoted several long-time critics of Haughey, like David Andrews, Séamus Brennan and Charlie McCreevy, to senior ministerial positions. Reynolds also promoted younger TDs from rural constituencies, such as Noel Dempsey and Brian Cowen, to cabinet positions. One of Haughey's oldest political allies, Bertie Ahern, remained Minister for Finance, agreeing with Reynolds not to challenge him for the leadership.

X Case 

On Reynolds's first day as Taoiseach, he had to deal with the "X Case", a constitutional case on whether a 14-year-old who had become pregnant as a result of rape could access abortion. The Attorney General, Harry Whelehan, refused to allow the pregnant girl to travel to the United Kingdom for an abortion. The High Court granted the Attorney General's injunction, while the Supreme Court found that abortion was permissible where there was a threat to a woman's life from suicide. The case strained relations between the coalition parties. Reynolds tried to find a middle ground but alienated both the Catholic Church and those who sought abortion rights. Three amendments to the constitution on abortion. The wording of the constitutional change caused tensions between the two government parties. Still, the government remained intact as the amendments passed through the Oireachtas. They were held on the same date as the 1992 general election. The first proposal was defeated, which would have excluded the risk of suicide from circumstances where abortion was permissible, while proposals to allow travel outside the state and access to information were approved.

European Union 
Reynolds negotiated considerable benefits for Ireland from the European Union regional aid budget in the aftermath of the Danish rejection of the Maastricht Treaty.

Beef Tribunal and 1992 election 
A tribunal of enquiry into irregularities in the beef industry referred to as the "Beef Tribunal", was established to examine the "unhealthy" relationship between Charles Haughey and beef baron Larry Goodman. This revealed to the public a substantial conflict of opinion between the two party leaders. At the tribunal, Desmond O'Malley severely criticised Reynolds, in his capacity as Minister for Industry and Commerce, for an export credit scheme. When Reynolds gave evidence, he referred to O'Malley as "dishonest". This enraged the Progressive Democrats' leader; his party called a motion of no confidence, which resulted in the Progressive Democrats withdrawing from government and the collapse of the government. Reynolds then sought a dissolution of the Dáil from the president, Mary Robinson. A general election was then called.

23rd Government of Ireland (1993–1994) 

The 1992 general election campaign was a disaster for Fianna Fáil. The world was in recession, the Haughey era was a recent memory, and the Gulf War dominated international news,  The fact that Reynolds seemed prepared to issue risky state-funded export insurance, effectively subsidising the Goodman business empire which now accounted for 12% of national GDP, when the country was in deep recession, shocked the electorate. Support for the party fell by 5%. The Labour Party under Dick Spring ran a campaign independent of its traditional coalition partner Fine Gael. It was Fianna Fáil's worst election result since 1927, losing nine seats. Fine Gael lost ten seats, while the Labour Party had its best result, with 33 seats. In January 1993, Fianna Fáil and Labour formed a government with Reynolds as Taoiseach and Spring as Tánaiste.

Tensions with Labour 

In 1993, Reynolds's Minister of Finance, Bertie Ahern, issued a tax amnesty for people who had outstanding tax bills unpaid and undeclared, provided they made some declaration of their previous income. This created considerable media disquiet and provoked Spring to make a policy statement. On 9 June 1994, Fianna Fáil lost two seats in the Mayo West by-election and the Dublin South-Central by-election to the opposition Fine Gael and Democratic Left, placing Reynolds under pressure, as he could no longer depend on Spring to remain in government.

The report on the Beef Tribunal was published in July 1994. The Labour Party had threatened to leave the government if Reynolds was criticised. Reynolds was alleged to have juxtaposed and misquoted sections of the report in issuing a rebuttal before the report became public. Spring was furious that the report was not considered by the cabinet first.

Northern Ireland and foreign affairs 

One of Reynolds's main achievements during his term as Taoiseach was in the peace process in the long-running conflict in Northern Ireland. Piecemeal negotiations had gone on during 1993 between Reynolds and British prime minister John Major, resulting in the Anglo-Irish agreement of 1993; on 15 December, the Downing Street Declaration was signed in London. Reynolds remained involved in discussions with Northern Ireland's nationalist parties and, along with John Hume, persuaded the Provisional Irish Republican Army (IRA) to call a complete ceasefire on 31 August 1994. Major was quoted at the time as saying:

In September 1994, Reynolds was left standing on the tarmac at Shannon Airport by Russian president Boris Yeltsin, who failed to emerge from his plane to meet awaiting Irish dignitaries. Headlines around the world alleged that Yeltsin was too drunk to appear; a Russian official said that he was unwell and aides later suggested that he had had a heart attack. Yeltsin later announced that he had overslept.

Whelehan controversy and downfall 

Reynolds had decided to reappoint Attorney General Harry Whelehan when the government was formed in 1992. When the position of President of the High Court became available, Reynolds proposed Whelehan. At this stage, allegations surfaced that Whelehan had been less than keen to prosecute a serial child abuser priest, Brendan Smyth, due to the implications that such an action concerned the accountability of certain prominent members of the Catholic hierarchy. It was later revealed that Whelehan, in his capacity as Attorney General (AG), had mishandled an attempt to extradite Smyth to Northern Ireland, where he was facing criminal charges. This was covered on the British television station Channel 4 when the Irish state broadcaster was mute, and Irish newspapers were effectively talking around the issue for fear of action for libel.

Spring led his ministers out of a cabinet meeting to consider the position of the Labour Party. The coalition appeared to be finished, but Reynolds still held out for the chance to patch things up. Reynolds went before the Dáil and said that if he had known "then" what he "knew now" about the incompetent handling of the case by the AG's office, he would not have appointed Whelehan to the judicial post.

However, Reynolds was damaged politically, appearing more interested in holding on to power than in the integrity of government actions. Spring decided that he could not go back into government with Reynolds, and the Labour Party resigned from the government on 16 November 1994.

Succession 
It was apparent that Reynolds no longer had enough support to govern, so he resigned as Taoiseach on 17 November 1994.

On 19 November 1994, Reynolds resigned as party leader, and the Minister for Finance Bertie Ahern was unanimously elected the sixth leader of Fianna Fáil. Reynolds's favoured successor, Máire Geoghegan-Quinn, withdrew from the leadership contest on the morning of the vote. It initially appeared that Labour would rejoin the coalition with Fianna Fáil under Ahern, allowing Ahern to ascend to the position of Taoiseach. Instead, Spring led Labour into successful coalition negotiations with Fine Gael and Democratic Left, and Fianna Fáil found themselves in opposition against a Rainbow Coalition. Reynolds remained acting Taoiseach until John Bruton took office on 15 December and then returned to the opposition backbenches.

Post-Taoiseach period 
On 4 February 1995, Reynolds was interviewed at length by Andrew Neil for his one-on-one interview show Is This Your Life?, made by Open Media for Channel 4.

At the beginning of 1997, Bertie Ahern allegedly encouraged Reynolds to run for office in the coming election and offered him the position of "peace envoy" to Northern Ireland and his support as a candidate for the presidency. Fianna Fáil won the election; however, Ahern allegedly reneged on this promise to Reynolds due to poor election results in his constituency and the change in the political situation in Northern Ireland. Reynolds was still interested in being a candidate for the presidency, along with two other Fianna Fáil candidates, Michael O'Kennedy and Mary McAleese. In a cabinet meeting, the Taoiseach (Ahern) gave a typically ambiguous speech which seemed to encourage his cabinet to support McAleese.

Reynolds won the first round of voting with a comfortable margin. Still, supporters of O'Kennedy backed McAleese, who was successful and became the Fianna Fáil nominee and the eighth president of Ireland.

Reynolds retired from politics at the 2002 general election, after 25 years as a TD; he was quoted in 2007 to state: "I don't bear any grudges over Ahern".

Reynolds was involved in a long-running libel action against British newspaper The Sunday Times over an article published in 1994, which alleged that Reynolds had deliberately and dishonestly misled the Dáil regarding matters in connection with the Brendan Smyth affair that brought down the coalition government. The newspaper claimed a defence of qualified privilege concerning these assertions based on their supposed benefit to the public, but a High Court jury found in favour of Reynolds in 1996. The jury recommended that no compensation be paid to the former Taoiseach. The judge subsequently awarded contemptuous damages of one penny in this action, leaving Reynolds with massive legal costs, estimated at £1 million. A subsequent court of appeal decision in 1998 declared that Reynolds had not received a fair hearing in his High Court action. The case continued to be heard in the House of Lords. This case led to the recognition under British law (and later introduction into Irish law as the "defence of fair and reasonable publication") of the so-called Reynolds defence of qualified privilege for publishers against whom libel actions regarding defamatory comments made in media publications are being taken.

In 1999, General Pervez Musharraf became President of Pakistan following a military coup. At the time, the White House did not recognise governments that came to power through a coup d'état. Business associates asked Reynolds to travel to Pakistan and meet Musharraf.

Musharraf asked Reynolds to act as an advisor to him and to contact US president Bill Clinton to reassure the White House as to the intentions of the new government of Pakistan. Reynolds claimed in later interviews that because of the trust built with Musharraf, he would be asked to arrange peace talks between India and Pakistan. These talks started in early 2001 but were interrupted by the 9/11 attacks, after which Musharraf could not contact the White House. He called Reynolds, who called former president Clinton, who quickly reached his successor George W. Bush to communicate the Pakistani position.

Mahon Tribunal 
In 1993, Reynolds and Bertie Ahern, then Minister for Finance, wrote to developer Owen O'Callaghan seeking a substantial donation. O'Callaghan was then heavily lobbying for state support for a stadium project at Neilstown, County Dublin. According to the report, O'Callaghan felt compelled to donate a sum of IR£80,000 to Fianna Fáil to get funding for the stadium. The Mahon Tribunal did not find the payment corrupt. However, the report noted that pressing a businessman to donate money when he was seeking support for a commercial project was "entirely inappropriate, and was an abuse of political power and government authority".

In November 2007, it was alleged at the Mahon Tribunal that Reynolds, while on government business in New York, collected a substantial sum of money for his Fianna Fáil party that did not get fully credited to the party. On the same trip, it emerged in the tribunal that Reynolds had the government jet make an additional and unscheduled five-hour stopover in the Bahamas.

Reynolds received annual pension payments of €149,740.

In July 2008, it was reported that Reynolds was medically unfit to give evidence at the Mahon Tribunal because of "significant cognitive impairment". Reynolds had on several previous occasions been due to give evidence concerning payments he allegedly received when he was Taoiseach.

Illness and death 
In December 2013, it was revealed by his son that Reynolds was in the last stages of Alzheimer's disease. Reynolds died on 21 August 2014. The last politician to visit him was former British prime minister Sir John Major, a close friend of Reynolds. The serving Taoiseach, Enda Kenny of Fine Gael, said at the time:  As Taoiseach he played an important part in bringing together differing strands of political opinion in Northern Ireland and as a consequence made an important contribution to the development of the peace process which eventually lead to the Good Friday Agreement.
The funeral, held at Church of the Sacred Heart, in Donnybrook, on 25 August 2014, was attended by President Michael D. Higgins, Taoiseach Enda Kenny, former British prime minister Sir John Major, former SDLP leader  John Hume, Sinn Féin president Gerry Adams, Northern Ireland secretary Theresa Villiers, former president Mary McAleese, former Taoisigh Liam Cosgrave, John Bruton, Bertie Ahern and Brian Cowen, Archbishop of Dublin Diarmuid Martin and the Lord Mayor of Dublin, Christy Burke. Other guests included former ministers Charlie McCreevy, Padraig Flynn, Dermot Ahern and Noel Dempsey, fashion designer Louise Kennedy and racehorse owner J. P. McManus. An unexpected visitor from overseas was the frail but vigorous Jean Kennedy Smith, former US ambassador to Ireland, who was the last surviving sibling of John F. Kennedy.
Reynolds was buried at Shanganagh Cemetery with full military honours.

Legacy 
His successor as Fianna Fáil leader, Bertie Ahern, who as Taoiseach was one of the negotiators of peace in Northern Ireland and had long been a political ally and friend, said on Reynolds's death: 

The Archbishop of Dublin, who attended the service, commented on Reynolds's determined character: 

Former Taoiseach and Fianna Fáil leader Brian Cowen expressed his sadness at the passing of their "close personal friend".

Michael O'Leary, the chief executive officer of Ryanair, said:

References

Bibliography

Writings 
 Reynolds, Albert, My Autobiography (Dublin 2010)

Secondary sources 
 Coakley, J & Rafter, K Irish Presidency: Power, Ceremony, and Politics (Dublin 2013)
 Kelly, S Fianna Fail, Partition and Northern Ireland, 1926–1971 (Dublin 2013)
 O'Donnell, Catherine, Fianna Fail, Irish republicanism and the Northern Ireland Troubles 1968–2005 (Kildare 2007)
 O'Reilly, Emily, Candidate: The Truth Behind the Presidential Campaign (Dublin 1991)
 Ryan, Tim, Albert Reynolds: The Longford Leader. The Unauthorised Biography (Dublin 1994)

External links 

 
1932 births
2014 deaths
Fianna Fáil TDs
Leaders of Fianna Fáil
Members of the 21st Dáil
Members of the 22nd Dáil
Members of the 23rd Dáil
Members of the 24th Dáil
Members of the 25th Dáil
Members of the 26th Dáil
Members of the 27th Dáil
Members of the 28th Dáil
Ministers for Finance (Ireland)
Ministers for Transport (Ireland)
People educated at Summerhill College
Politicians from County Roscommon
Taoisigh
Ministers for Enterprise, Trade and Employment